Samuel Storey, Baron Buckton (18 January 1896 – 17 January 1978), known as Sir Samuel Storey, 1st Baronet, from 1960 to 1966, was a British Conservative politician.

Storey was the son of Frederick George Storey and his wife Mary Dagmar née Hutton, and was educated at Haileybury and Trinity College, Cambridge. After graduation, he became a barrister in the Inner Temple in 1919 and joined Sunderland Borough Council in 1928. He was elected as Member of Parliament (MP) for the Sunderland constituency at the 1931 general election (a post his namesake grandfather had held from 1881 to 1895 and briefly in 1910), and held the seat in the House of Commons until his defeat at the 1945 general election.  He joined the East Riding of Yorkshire County Council in 1946.

Storey returned to Parliament at the 1950 general election, when he was elected MP for Stretford and during his tenure was Chairman of the Standing Committees and Temporary Chairman of the Committees of the House of Commons in 1957 and Chairman of the Committee of Ways and Means from 1965–66.

He was created a baronet in February 1960 and, after his  defeat at the 1966 general election,  he was given a life peerage as Baron Buckton, of Settrington in the East Riding of the County of York.

Lord Buckton died in January 1978, aged 81. The life barony became extinct on his death while he was succeeded in the hereditary baronetcy by his son, Richard.

Arms

References

External links 
 

Buckton, Samuel Storey, Baron
Buckton, Samuel Storey, Baron
Baronets in the Baronetage of the United Kingdom
Conservative Party (UK) MPs for English constituencies
Deputy Speakers of the British House of Commons
Buckton, Samuel Storey, Baron
Councillors in Tyne and Wear
Buckton, Samuel Storey, Baron
Buckton, Samuel Storey, Baron
UK MPs 1931–1935
UK MPs 1935–1945
UK MPs 1950–1951
UK MPs 1951–1955
UK MPs 1955–1959
UK MPs 1959–1964
UK MPs 1964–1966
UK MPs who were granted peerages
Life peers created by Elizabeth II